Kari Lise Holmberg (born 7 September 1951 in Skien) is a Norwegian politician for the Conservative Party.

She was elected to the Norwegian Parliament from Telemark in 2001, and has been re-elected on one occasion. She had previously served as a deputy representative during the term 1997–2001. As the only representative of her party she is a member of Israels Venner på Stortinget.

On the local level Holmberg was a member of Skien municipality council from 1987 to 2001, serving as mayor in 1999–2001.

Outside politics she worked as a school teacher and rector.

References

1951 births
Living people
Mayors of places in Telemark
Members of the Storting
Conservative Party (Norway) politicians
Politicians from Skien
Telemark University College alumni
Volda University College alumni
Women mayors of places in Norway
21st-century Norwegian politicians
21st-century Norwegian women politicians
Women members of the Storting